The World Group was the highest level of Fed Cup competition in 2004. Sixteen nations competed in a four-round knockout competition. World No. 1 team France was the defending champion, but they were defeated in the final by World No. 5 team and four-time finalist Russia. As such, Russia ascended to World No. 2.

Participating Teams

Draw

First round

France vs. Germany

Czech Republic vs. Italy

Spain vs. Switzerland

Croatia vs. Belgium

Russia vs. Australia

Argentina vs. Japan

Slovakia vs. Austria

Slovenia vs. United States

Quarterfinals

France vs. Italy

Spain vs. Belgium

Russia vs. Argentina

Austria vs. United States

Semifinals

France vs. Spain

Russia vs. Austria

Final

France vs. Russia

See also
Fed Cup structure

References

World Group